Frailyn S. Florián Padilla (born July 25, 1982) is a Dominican professional baseball outfielder for the T & A San Marino of the Italian Baseball League.

Florián also played for the Italy national baseball team at the 2017 World Baseball Classic and with the Orel Anzio of the Italian League.

References

External links

1982 births
Baseball pitchers
Brevard County Manatees players
Caffe Danesi Nettuno players
Cardenales de Lara players
American expatriate baseball players in Venezuela
Dominican Republic baseball players
Dominican Republic expatriate baseball players in Italy
Dominican Republic expatriate baseball players in the United States
Estrellas Orientales players
Expatriate baseball players in San Marino
Greensboro Bats players
Gulf Coast Marlins players
Jupiter Hammerheads players
Kane County Cougars players
Mixed-race Dominicans
Living people
Orel Anzio players
People from Espaillat Province
Tigres del Licey players
Toros del Este players
T & A San Marino players
2017 World Baseball Classic players
Dominican Republic expatriate baseball players in Venezuela